The Sacred Congregation of Rites was a congregation of the Roman Curia, erected on 22 January  1588 by Pope Sixtus V by Immensa Aeterni Dei; it had its functions reassigned by Pope Paul VI on 8 May 1969.

The Congregation was charged with the supervision of the liturgy, the dispensation of the decrees of Canonical coronations,  other various sacraments, and  the process of canonization of saints. With the modern reforms of Pope Paul VI after the Second Vatican Council, it was divided into the Congregation for the Causes of Saints and the Congregation for Divine Worship and the Discipline of the Sacraments.

The secretary, or second-highest official of the Congregation once served as the personal sacristan to the Pope.

Prefects
Flavio Chigi (1759–1771)
Mario Marefoschi Compagnoni (1771–1785)
Giulio Maria della Somaglia (1800–1814)
Giorgio Doria Pamphilj Landi (1821–1837)
Carlo Maria Pedicini (1837–1843)
Ludovico Micara, OFM Cap (1843–1844)
Luigi Lambruschini, B (1847–1854)
Costantino Patrizi Naro (1854–1860)
Luigi Bilio, B (1876–1877)
Tommaso Martinelli, OSA (1877–1878)
Domenico Bartolini (1878–1886)
Angelo Bianchi (1887–1897)
Carlo Laurenzi (1889–1895)
Camillo Mazzella, SJ (1897–1900)
Gaetano Aloisi Masella (1899–1902)
Domenico Ferrata (1900–1902)
Serafino Cretoni (1903–1909)
Luigi Tripepi (1903–1906)
Sebastiano Martinelli, OSA (1909–1918)
Scipione Tecchi (1914–1915)
Antonio Vico (1915–1929)
Camillo Laurenti (1929–1938)
Carlo Salotti (1938 – 24 October 1947)
Clemente Micara (1950–1953)
Gaetano Cicognani (1953–1956)
Arcadio Larraona Saralegui, CMF (1962–1968)
Benno Gut, OSB (1967–1969)

See also
Aloisio Gardellini

External links
Catholic Encyclopedia
Catholic-Hierarchy

Congregations of the Roman Curia
Former departments of the Roman Curia
1588 establishments in the Papal States
1969 disestablishments in Vatican City
Canonization